You Were Meant for Me is a 1948 musical film directed by Lloyd Bacon and starring Dan Dailey and Jeanne Crain as a bandleader and his wife. It was released by 20th Century Fox. The film includes performances of "You Were Meant for Me", "I'll Get By (As Long As I Have You)", and "Ain't Misbehavin'".

Marilyn Monroe may have worked on the film as an uncredited extra.

Plot summary

Chuck Arnold (Dan Dailey) is a bandleader during the 1920s. He meets hometown girl Peggy Mayhew (Jeanne Crain), a flapper script girl, at one of the band's presentations, and the next day, they get married. Though she loves him, life on the road becomes increasingly difficult for her, and eventually, with the onset of the Great Depression, in 1929, she tires of it, and returns to her country home. Unable to find new bookings, he soon joins her, and brings with him Oscar Hoffman (Oscar Levant) his acerbic, cynical manager. The bandleader finds the pastoral life a crashing bore, and so, he heads for the big city to find fortune. This time, he succeeds, and happiness is the result.

Cast
 Jeanne Crain as Peggy Mayhew
 Dan Dailey as Chuck Arnold
 Oscar Levant as Oscar Hoffman
 Barbara Lawrence as Louise Crane
 Selena Royle as Mrs. Cora Mayhew
 Percy Kilbride as Mr. Andrew Mayhew
 Herbert Anderson as Eddie
 Harry Barris as Harry, the pianist

Soundtracks
 Concerto in F
 Music by George Gershwin
 Happy Days Are Here Again
 Music by Milton Ager
 Lyrics by Jack Yellen
 Lilacs in the Rain
 Music by Peter De Rose
 You Were Meant for Me
 Music by Nacio Herb Brown
 Lyrics by Arthur Freed
 If I Had You
 Written by Ted Shapiro, Jimmy Campbell, and Reginald Connelly
 Can't Sleep a Wink
 Written by Charles Henderson
 Crazy Rhythm
 Music by Joseph Meyer and Roger Wolfe Kahn
 Lyrics by Irving Caesar
 I'll Get By
 Music by Fred E. Ahlert
 Lyrics by Roy Turk
 Good Night, Sweetheart
 Written by Ray Noble, Jimmy Campbell, and Reginald Connelly
 Ain't Misbehavin'
 Music by Fats Waller and Harry Brooks
 Lyrics by Andy Razaf
 Ain't She Sweet?
 Music by Milton Ager
 Lyrics by Jack Yellen

See also
 "You Were Meant for Me" (1929 song), a pop standard written by Arthur Freed and Nacio Herb Brown.
 "I'll Get By (As Long As I Have You)" (1928 song), a pop standard written by Fred E. Ahlert and Roy Turk.
 "Ain't Misbehavin'" (1929 song), a slide/jazz standard written by Fats Waller, Harry Brooks, and Andy Razaf.

References

External links
 
 
 
 

1948 films
1940s English-language films
Films directed by Lloyd Bacon
1948 musical films
20th Century Fox films
American musical films
American black-and-white films
1940s American films